The IIF file format, Intuit Interchange Format is a proprietary text file used by Intuit's Quickbooks software for importing and exporting lists and transactions.

References

External links
 

Computer file formats
Intuit